{{Album reviews
|rev1 = AllMusic
|rev1score = (favorable)
|rev2 = Sputnikmusic|rev2score = 
}}No Regrets is the fifth studio album by American nu metal band Dope. The album was released on March 10, 2009. The album debuted at number 88 with 6,200 copies sold in its first week, making it the second highest-charted album in the band's history, even though American Apathy sold nearly 3,000 more copies during its first week of release. It remained Dope's highest charting album until Blood Money Part 1 peaked at number 27 in 2016.

Track listing

In popular media
 The song "Nothing for Me Here" is featured in the video game Guitar Hero III: Legends of Rock as a bonus track, therefore making the song's original release date in 2007, two years before No Regrets'' was released.

Chart positions

Album

Singles

Personnel
Dope
 Edsel Dope – lead vocals, backing vocals, rhythm guitar, bass, drums, keyboards, programming, sampling
 Virus – lead guitar, bass, backing vocals, keyboards
 Derrick "Tripp" Tribbett – bass, backing vocals
 Angel Bartolotta – drums

Additional personnel
 Zakk Wylde – guitar solo on "Addiction"

Production
 Edsel Dope – production, executive production, art conception, audio production, engineering, mixing
 Virus – engineering, production
 Tadpole – audio engineering, mixing, production
 Angel Bartolotta – editing
 Molly Hankins – management
 Stephen Jensen – art conception, art direction, design, photography
 Patrick Szczypinski – assistant
 Pete "Shakes" Szczypinski – editing
 Ted Jensen – mastering
 Bob Ringe – management

References

2009 albums
Dope (band) albums
MNRK Music Group albums